San Andrés is a town and municipality in the Santander Department in northeastern Colombia. Olympian Noe Balvin was born here.

References

Municipalities of Santander Department